Simon Bolivar Buckner Jr. (July 18, 1886 – June 18, 1945) was a lieutenant general in the United States Army during World War II who served in the Pacific Theater. As commanding general of Alaska Defense Command, Buckner commanded American-Canadian forces in the Aleutian Islands campaign, including the Battle of Attu and the Kiska Expedition. Following that assignment, he was promoted to command the Tenth Army, which conducted the amphibious invasion of the Japanese island of Okinawa in 1945. He was killed during the closing days of the Battle of Okinawa by enemy artillery fire, making him the highest-ranking United States military officer lost to enemy fire during World War II.

Buckner, Lesley J. McNair, Frank Maxwell Andrews, and Millard Harmon, all lieutenant generals at the time of their deaths, were the highest-ranking Americans to be killed in World War II. Buckner and McNair were posthumously promoted to the rank of four-star general on July 19, 1954, by a Special Act of Congress (Public Law 83-508).

Early life and education
Buckner was the son of Confederate general Simon Bolivar Buckner and his wife Delia Hayes Claiborne. Buckner and his father are named after the Venezuelan soldier and statesman, Simón Bolívar, who led what are currently the countries of Colombia, Venezuela, Ecuador, Panama, Peru, and Bolivia to independence from the Spanish Empire. His father was Governor of Kentucky from 1887 to 1891, and was the Gold Democratic Party's candidate for Vice President of the United States in 1896. Buckner was raised near Munfordville, Kentucky, and accompanied his father on his 1896 presidential campaign when he served as the running mate of ex-Union general John M. Palmer.

Military career
Buckner attended the Virginia Military Institute. When he turned 18 in the summer of 1904, his father asked President Theodore Roosevelt to grant him an appointment to West Point. Roosevelt granted this request and Buckner graduated in the class of 1908. He served two military tours in the Philippines, and wrote about his adventures in Tales of the Philippines – In the Early 1900s. During World War I, he served as a temporary major, drilling discipline into aviator cadets.

Inter-war period
For the 17 years beginning May 1919, Buckner's assignments were not with troops but with military schools as follows: four years as tactical officer at the United States Military Academy, West Point, New York; one year as student at The Infantry School at Fort Benning, Georgia; four years at the Command and General Staff School, Ft. Leavenworth, Kansas, with the first year as a student (distinguished graduate), then three years as instructor; four years at the Army War College, Washington, D.C., with year one as student then three years as executive officer; four more years at West Point, as Assistant Commandant and Commandant of Cadets. At West Point, "His rule is remembered for constructive progressiveness, with a share of severity tempered with hard, sound sense, and justice." However, one cadet's parent commented: "Buckner forgets cadets are born, not quarried".

Buckner was with troops for the rest of his career. In September 1936 he became executive officer of the 23rd Infantry Regiment at Ft. Sam Houston in Texas. Promoted to colonel in January 1937, he was given command of the 66th Infantry (Light Tank) at Ft. Meade in Maryland. In September 1938, he commanded of the 22nd Infantry at Ft. McClellan, Alabama. From November 1939 to August 1940 he was Chief of Staff of the 6th Division at Camp Jackson in South Carolina, Ft. Benning in Georgia, and Camp Beauregard in Louisiana.

World War II

Alaska

Buckner was promoted to brigadier general in 1940 and was assigned to fortify and protect Alaska as commander of the Army's Alaska Defense Command. He was promoted to major general in August 1941. Alaskan waters, including areas along the Aleutian Islands and into the Bering Sea coastline, had previously been reconnoitered by Imperial Japanese Naval vessels in the 1930s.

The potential for some kind of action was considered seriously by both US and Canadian Forces. When the US was finally drawn into World War II, the defense of Alaska had already been underway - but no one knew the where, when or how the Japanese would attack. It came in a stunning surprise attack on Dutch Harbor 3–5 June 1942; farther west, Imperial Japanese forces seized the islands Kiska and Attu, bringing ashore some 7,000 troops (at Kiska) and nearly 3,000 at Attu.

American commanders, including Buckner, feared that the Japanese would use the islands as bases to strike within range along the rest of the US West Coast. The West Coast was previously attacked several times in the past six months (including unrestricted submarine warfare in coastal waters, the bombardment of Ellwood in California and the bombardment of Fort Stevens in Oregon). Lieutenant Paul Bishop of the 28th Bombardment Group recalled that:

 

Buckner gave orders in June 1942 for the indigenous Aleut people to be evacuated and for their villages to be burned. The Aleut people were not allowed to return until 1945, after the war was over. Buckner furthermore objected to the deployment of African American troops in Alaska, writing to his superiors of his concern that they would remain after the war, "with the natural result that they would interbreed with the Indians and the Eskimos and produce an astonishingly objectionable race of mongrels which would be a problem".

The campaign to take back Attu Island took nearly a year. The Battle for Attu, Operation Landcrab, occurred across three weeks in May 1943. The casualties on both sides were high. On shore, some 549 US soldiers were killed, 1,148 were wounded, and 1,814 suffered cold and disease.  Of the 2,900 Japanese garrison, only 28 survived. Off shore and in the air overhead, many dozens of airmen and sailors of both sides lost their lives during the months of the Aleutian Campaign.

Subsequently, in August 1943, Kiska was invaded by Canadian and US soldiers. Just as at Attu, the weather conspired to aid the enemy. An estimated 5,400 soldiers and sailors had been secretly withdrawn by the Imperial Navy under cover of fog prior to the arrival of allied forces. Allied commanders refused to believe that the Japanese could have completely evacuated Kiska. For eight days, troops searched the island, firing into the dense fog and sometimes accidentally shooting their comrades. 24 Allied soldiers were killed by friendly fire, four by Japanese booby traps, and a further 71 died when the ship  Abner Read struck a floating mine. 168 Allied soldiers were wounded or fell ill on Kiska. The bombardment and invasion of the deserted island was written off as a “training exercise,” and the Aleutian Campaign officially ended after 439 days of warfare. This constituted the Aleutian Islands campaign. In 1943, he was promoted to lieutenant general.

Battle of Okinawa

In July 1944, Buckner was sent to Hawaii to organize the Tenth Army, which was composed of both Army and Marine Corps units. The original mission of the Tenth Army was to prepare for the invasion of Taiwan; however, this operation was canceled, and Buckner's command was instead ordered to prepare for the Battle of Okinawa. Beginning on April 1, 1945, this turned out to be one of the largest, slowest, and bloodiest sealandair battles in American military history. Despite historic amphibious assets, Buckner insisted on a frontal assault on the dug-in Japanese, although extremely costly in American lives, his strategy was ultimately successful. Late in the battle, Buckner failed to realize that the Japanese were pulling back to a secondary defensive line, allowing the Japanese to avoid  destruction and escape with a significant force. Reducing this force in the southern part of the island cost enormous casualties, especially among the civilian population, who were trapped in the battle zone.

A quote of his from 1945 was reported in the newspapers back home when he said that he intended to Christianize the Japanese and that "the best way to do that was to give them a Christian burial".

Death
On June 18, Buckner arrived in his command jeep which was flying its standard 3-star flag to visit a forward observation post on a ridge approximately  behind the front lines, as Marine infantry advanced on the Japanese-held Ibaru Ridge. Visits from the general were not always welcome as his presence frequently drew enemy fire, usually as he was departing. Buckner had arrived with his standard three stars showing on the front of his steel helmet and a nearby Marine outpost sent a signal to Buckner's position stating that they could clearly see the general's three stars on his helmet. Told of this, Buckner replaced his own helmet with an unmarked one.

As Buckner stood at the outpost, a small flat-trajectory Japanese artillery shell of unknown caliber (estimated to have been 47mm) struck a coral rock outcrop near him, and fragments pierced his chest. Buckner was carried by stretcher to a nearby aid station, where he died on the operating table. He was succeeded in command by Marine General Roy Geiger. Total American deaths during the battle of Okinawa were 12,513.

Buckner was interred in the family plot at Frankfort Cemetery in Frankfort, Kentucky.

Personal life
Buckner was married to Adele Blanc Buckner (1893–1988). They had three children: Simon Bolivar Buckner III, Mary Blanc Buckner, and William Claiborne Buckner.

Legacy

Named in honor of Buckner:
 Fort Buckner, an Army sub-post of the Marine Corps' Camp Foster on Okinawa, is home to the 78th Signal Battalion and E Co. of the 53rd Signal Battalion and includes a small memorial to its namesake.
 , an Admiral W. S. Benson class troop transport.
 Nakagusuku Bay on the East side of Okinawa was nicknamed "Buckner Bay" in the 1940s by American military personnel. They often refer to it as such to this day, even in official correspondence.
 West Point's Camp Buckner, where yearlings (incoming sophomores) go through Cadet Field Training (CFT).
 Several places built in Alaska during Cold War-related military construction, including:
 Buckner Gymnasium (also Fieldhouse and Physical Fitness Center) at Fort Richardson (now part of Joint Base Elmendorf-Richardson) in Anchorage, Alaska, a post which the general established during World War II.
 The Buckner Building in Whittier, Alaska, once the largest building in Alaska by square footage.
 Buckner Drive in the Nunaka Valley subdivision of Anchorage, originally built as military housing.
 Buckner Drive in Fort Leavenworth's Normandy Village.
 Buckner Avenue in Fort George Meade's Heritage Park.
 Buckner Gate at Fort Shafter, Hawaii.
 Buckner Hall, the Headquarters Building at the former Fort McClellan
 Buckner Circle, the street at the former Fort McClellan where the senior officer homes (20) were located, all facing a central greenspace
 Buckner Road, Mount Vernon, Virginia, along with McNair Road, Patton Road and Stillwell Avenue, all US Army generals in Woodlawn Manor neighborhood.

Military awards
Buckner's military decorations and awards include:

Dates of rank

References

Bibliography

External links
Papers of Simon Bolivar Buckner Jr., Dwight D. Eisenhower Presidential Library
Family Home Page
His monument at Kuniyoshi, Itoman City Okinawa, where he died. 

USNS General Simon B. Buckner (T-AP-123)
Generals of World War II
General Simon Bolivar Buckner Jr. Deadeyes 96th Infantry Division
Operations in Snow and Extreme Cold-Basic Field Manual Manuscript at Dartmouth College Library

1886 births
1945 deaths
Military personnel from Kentucky
United States Military Academy faculty
United States Army Command and General Staff College faculty
United States Army War College faculty
Virginia Military Institute alumni
United States Army War College alumni
United States Army Infantry Branch personnel
United States Army personnel killed in World War II
Burials at Frankfort Cemetery
People from Hart County, Kentucky
Recipients of the Distinguished Service Medal (US Army)
United States Army generals of World War II
United States Army generals
United States Military Academy alumni
Commandants of the Corps of Cadets of the United States Military Academy
United States Army Command and General Staff College alumni
Recipients of the Navy Distinguished Service Medal
Aleutian Islands campaign
United States Army personnel of World War I